Clémentine (pronounced ) was a 1985 French animated television series (in co-production with Japan). The series consisted of 39 episodes which featured the fantastic adventures of a 10-year-old girl (Clémentine Dumat) who uses a wheelchair. The show was produced by "IDDH", a company that originally started out producing French-dubbed versions of Japanese anime. It originally aired on Antenne 2 (now France 2). The series was released on VHS in 1990 and on DVD in 2006.

Overview
Clémentine is the daughter of a famous French pilot and war hero Alex Dumat, who raised her alone with her brother Petit Boy. After she lost the use of her legs in an airplane accident, she travels the world with her family to find a cure that will allow her to walk again. Meanwhile, in her nightly dreams, she can walk and her cat Hélice (French for "propeller") can talk and fly with the help of a helicopter-like apparatus on its head. Clementine leads a battle against the demon Malmoth, with the guidance of her guardian angel Héméra, travelling in a magical blue sphere. Occasionally, in these travels through fantasy and time, she meets famous fictional characters such as Pinocchio, Aladdin and Oliver Twist. She also frequently meets historic characters, especially aviation pioneers such as Charles Lindbergh, and Kateri Tekakwitha.

The series creator, Bruno-René Huchez, based the main plot on his own personal childhood memories. When he was young, he fell very sick and was confined to a bed, and his mother used to tell him all sort of fairy tales to cheer him up. Those events, decades later, would become the basis of the show's main plot.

Popularity
The series is considered as a cult classic in Europe (especially in Turkey, where it seems to be much more popular than it is in its home country France).

Between 1990 and 1995, it was translated to Arabic in Lebanon, as well as English, Chinese, Turkish and Latin-American Spanish. It is also a classic worldwide, as it is quite well known in China, and Latin America.

Clementine is barely remembered in the U.S., where the series was never broadcast as it is, but was converted into 2 compilation films by Celebrity Home Entertainment (under their "Just For Kids" imprint), entitled (without the accent mark):

 "Clementine's Enchanted Journey"
 "Clementine: A Young Girl and Her Dreams"

The majority of the characters' names were changed in the English dub.

Controversy
While being very popular among devoted fans, some question whether the featured tragic flow of events and the scary look of the main villain Malmoth, a demon made of flames, were appropriate for young children. Also, although Malmoth's envoys look like regular humans during their missions on Earth, often trying to kill Clementine, they are cursed men that regularly inhabit a hellish realm where they return after being killed in action. Their true form combines their human heads and faces with the bodies of creatures conventionally regarded as repulsive such as worms, insects and scorpions etc. In the U.S. compilation films, some scenes were deleted.

In her adventure in Egypt, Clementine ends up marrying Tutankhamun and later has to kill herself in order to travel to the land of the dead. She drinks some poison and is judged by Anubis but goes on without further trouble as she is pure of heart. At the end of the Egyptian saga back at her present time, her father's mechanic friend comes around, saying that Tutankhamun's tomb has been found. Clementine mentions jokingly that someone has finally found her husband's tomb. Everyone laughs upon hearing this when it turns out to be actually true. The date is wrong, however, as Tutankhamun's tomb was found in 1922, not 1925. In some foreign dubs, the poison was changed to a magic potion that would turn her into a spirit (as in astral projection).

Episode list (in French)

Season 1
01. Le sinistre Mollache
02. La fuite en ballon
03. L'accident
04. La vengeance de Malmoth
05. L'opération du diable
06. Clémentine en Italie: La fête à Venise
07. Clémentine en Italie: La fosse aux murènes
08. Clémentine en Allemagne: La maison de gâteau
09. Clémentine en Allemagne: Le secret du miroir
10. Clémentine en Angleterre: Le bébé sauvé des eaux
11. Clémentine en Angleterre: La chasse à l'homme
12. Clémentine en Suède: À la recherche de Nils Holgersson
13. Clémentine en Suède: Les veuves rouges
14. Clémentine en Afrique: Le petit roi de la jungle ou Mohann, l'enfant de la jungle
15. Clémentine en Afrique: L'herbe de vie
16. Clémentine au pays des Mille et une Nuits: Pour les beaux yeux d'une princesse
17. Clémentine au pays des Mille et une Nuits: Clémentine, général de l'armée des sables
18. Clémentine au Canada: La cabane des Batifole
19. Clémentine au Canada: Les Gorges des Mille-Échos
20. Clémentine en Espagne: L'or et la peste
21. Clémentine en Espagne: L'armada des Toros
22. Clémentine en Égypte: La cité de l'Horizon
23. Clémentine en Égypte: Le voyage au pays des morts
24. Clémentine au Japon: La voie du Sabre
25. Clémentine au Japon: La peur vaincue ou La guérison de Clémentine

Season 2
26. La guerre des Grouillants
27. La drôle de guerre
28. La mort au bout du monde
29. La ligne
30. Le courrier des Amériques
31. Ginette as de pique
32. Les aviontures du père Tompier
33. La fiancée de Malmoth
34. Le dragon dans les nuages
35. Le fou des steppes
36. Le chant d'amour
37. Clémentine superstar
38. Malmorea
39. Le dernier voyage

Crew
Directed by René Borg and Jean Cubaud.
Story by Bruno-René Huchez.
Written by Olivier Massart and Gilles Taurand.

Live action film
In 2006, Turkish screenwriter and producer/director Stare Yıldırım optioned the story rights for a live action film adaption of Clementine. So far names like Johnny Depp and Gary Oldman have been mentioned to be part of the film, but there has not been any official word from them. The screenplay was to be written in English and was planned to target a worldwide audience. Turkish company called Medyavision was reported to finance the film with a targeted budget of $80-$100 million (U.S. dollars). No further updates were provided about the project and its status is unknown.

See also
 List of French animated television series
 List of French television series

References

External links

 
 Information page in Turkish
 Fan Club French
 Original Clementine Site in French
 The New Anatolian on the Clementine live action project
 Shefilms, the official site for the Clementine film
 Variety on the Clementine film

1985 French television series debuts
1980s French animated television series
French children's animated fantasy television series
Animated television series about children
Télé-Québec original programming
Television series set in the 1920s
Period television series
Fictional aviators